John Wade Kelly (born November 19, 1984) is an American endurance athlete who specializes in ultrarunning.

Early life
Kelly was raised in Morgan County, Tennessee. He was a good but not outstanding runner in high school, after which he did not compete in the sport for several years until 2013, when he ran the Marine Corps Marathon. After subsequently qualifying for the Boston Marathon, he decided to use ultramarathons and triathlons to maintain his fitness and motivation.

American ultras and triathlons
In 2017, Kelly became the fifteenth finisher in the history of the Barkley Marathons. He completed the required five loops in a total time of 59:30, around half an hour inside the time limit for the full course. It was his third attempt at the race, having managed three loops in 2015 and four in 2016. Later in 2017, Kelly won the Road Runners Club of America National Ultra Championship at the Lookout Mountain 50 Miler.

The next year, he set a course record of 23:48 at the Wild Oak Trail Run in Virginia and was an age group champion at the ITU Long Distance Triathlon World Championships. Thereafter, Kelly became a professional triathlete for just one race, Ironman Arizona, before turning his attention more closely to ultrarunning.

He won the Franklins 200 Mile race in Texas in February 2019 in a time of 60:53.

British races and records
Soon after his Franklins win, Kelly moved with his family to the UK, and in late May 2019, he began an attempt at what he termed the Grand Round. This involved consecutively running the three best-known fell running rounds (the Paddy Buckley in Wales, the Bob Graham in England and the Ramsay in Scotland) and getting between them by cycling. On this occasion, Kelly was able to complete the Paddy Buckley Round, cycle to Keswick, and finish the Bob Graham Round. He then began the cycling section towards Fort William, but safety concerns relating to tiredness led him to abandon the challenge.

In January 2020, Kelly took first place at the Spine Race, the route of which largely follows the Pennine Way. Late in the race, he was challenged by Jayson Cavill, but Cavill was forced to drop out due to tendonitis and Kelly was ultimately left with a comfortable margin of victory.

Kelly revisited the Pennine Way in July the same year. With more daylight and the expectation of better weather than in the Spine Race, as well as not having to carry as much equipment, he aimed to beat Mike Hartley’s 1989 record of 65:20. Despite losing time against his schedule in the second half of the run, Kelly was fast enough to set a new record of 64:46. He ran the route in the south to north direction, from Edale to Kirk Yetholm, in contrast to Hartley's north to south traverse. Although Hartley's best had stood for over thirty years, Kelly's record of 64:46 only lasted eight days until it was beaten by Damian Hall who completed the Way in 61:35.

He finished the route in a total time of 130:43. This was the first time that the Grand Round had been completed. In 1990, Mike Hartley had run the three rounds in a total time from start to finish of 86:20, but he had used motorized transport between the rounds rather than cycling. Due to the connections with Hartley, Kelly referred to the Pennine Way run and the Grand Round collectively as the Hartley Slam.

Kelly made a further attempt on the Pennine Way in May 2021, hoping to avoid the gastrointestinal problems which had restricted him the previous year. This time he ran the Way from north to south, as Hartley and Hall had done on their record runs.

In July 2021, Kelly set out to run a circuit of the 214 Wainwrights in the Lake District but foot problems and high temperatures caused an end to the undertaking. Shortly before returning to the United States, he attempted the Wainwrights a second time in May 2022 and completed the whole route in a record time of 5 days, 12 hours, 14 minutes, beating the previous record set by Sabrina Verjee by 11 hours and 35 minutes.

Return to the US
Kelly was tenth man in the Hardrock 100 in 2022. Later in the year, in a change to his accustomed distance and terrain, he ran a time of 2:26:50 at the California International Marathon.

In March 2023 Kelly became a two-time finisher of the Barkley Marathons with a time of 58:42:23.

Data science career
Kelly has a PhD in electrical engineering and machine learning from Carnegie Mellon. He works as Chief Technology Officer of Envelop Risk, having previously been employed by Lockheed Martin and QxBranch.

References

Living people
1984 births
American male ultramarathon runners
American male triathletes
Fell runners
Data scientists